Dolno Vranovci is a village in the municipality of Čaška, North Macedonia. It used to be part of the former municipality of Izvor.

Demographics
Toward the end of the 19th and beginning of the 20th centuries, Dolno Vranovci traditionally was a mixed Orthodox Macedonian and Macedonian Muslim (Torbeš) village. The Macedonian Muslim population left the village after the Second World War.

According to the 2002 census, the village had a total of 38 inhabitants. Ethnic groups in the village include:

Macedonians 27
Albanians 8
Others 3

References

Villages in Čaška Municipality
Macedonian Muslim villages
Albanian communities in North Macedonia